Putting People First may refer to:
Bill Clinton's Presidential campaign slogan, and the name of a campaign book co-authored by Clinton and Al Gore
A UK government paper key to the Person Centred Planning approach.
A minor political party with representation on Southampton City Council